Paul Robeson High School for Human Services is a district-run high school in Philadelphia with citywide admissions. The school is one of eight schools in the country that offers a focus in the human services field. The school is named after Paul Robeson.

As part of Philadelphia's shutdown of 23 district-run schools in 2013, some displaced students from University City High School were relocated to Paul Robeson High School for Human Services.

External links

Paul Robeson High School for Human Services Website

Notes

Paul Robeson High School for Human Services
School District of Philadelphia
Public high schools in Pennsylvania